Monacan may refer to:

Something of, from, or related to Monaco
Monégasque dialect, the local dialect of Monaco
Monacan people, a Native American tribe recognized by the state of Virginia
Monacan High School, a high school in Virginia

See also

Language and nationality disambiguation pages